Next wave or The Next Wave may refer to

Books
 Nextwave,  a humorous comic book series by Warren Ellis and Stuart Immonen, published by Marvel Comics between 2006 and 2007
 The Next Wave: Using Digital Technology to Further Social and Political Innovation, a book by Darrell M. West

Film and TV
The Next Wave (TV series), science interview program hosted by Leonard Nimoy
The Love Boat: The Next Wave, revival of the original 1977–1986 ABC sitcom
War of the Worlds 2: The Next Wave, 2008 direct-to-DVD science fiction film

Music
Next Wave Festival biennial festival based in Melbourne, Australia
BAM Next Wave Festival in New York City, see Brooklyn Academy of Music
Next Wave Jazz Ensemble, musical ensemble based at the United States Naval Academy
Next Wave (album),  2003 house album by Mondo Grosso
The Nextwave Sessions, EP by British indie rock band Bloc Party

Other
NextWave Wireless, NextWave,  wireless technology company that produces mobile multimedia